The Poncione d'Alnasca is a mountain of the Lepontine Alps, located east of Brione in the canton of Ticino. It is located on the range south of the Cima di Gagnone.

The south side consists of a pyramid-shaped and almost vertical rock face.

References

External links
 A climb of Poncione d'Alnasca (short documentary)
 Poncione d'Alnasca on Hikr

Mountains of the Alps
Mountains of Ticino
Lepontine Alps
Mountains of Switzerland